Kalateh-ye Tolaki (also Romanized as Kalāteh-ye Tolakī) is a village in Bizaki Rural District, Golbajar District, Chenaran County, Razavi Khorasan Province, Iran. At the 2006 census, its population was 112, in 24 families.

References 

Populated places in Chenaran County